WIFY (93.7 FM) is an adult album alternative formatted radio station that is part of The Point radio network. Licensed to Addison, Vermont, United States, the station serves the Middlebury, Vermont, Burlington, Vermont-Plattsburgh, New York area.  The station is owned by Radio Broadcasting Services, Inc.

History

The station was assigned call sign WWFY on October 18, 1996. On December 8, 1997, the station changed its call sign to WWFY. On April 30, 1999, the call letters changed to WRRO. When the station launched, it went by the name "The Arrow" and broadcast a Classic rock format. The station changed calls & formats again on April 23, 2001 to WXAL-FM with a Hot Adult Contemporary format as Alice. Around 2003, the station began putting a simulcast on WLKC (now WWMP 103.3), changing from Hot Adult Contemporary (this caused rival WEZF changing back to Adult Contemporary, even though they have never changed formats since 2003).  By 2005, WLKC & WXAL-FM changed formats to Adult Hits under the name MP103. By September 7, 2005, the station changed to WUSX with a Country format, and the simulcast with WWMP ended. On July 1, 2008, the station changed format from to Oldies as "Cruisin' 93.7". The first song was 409 by The Beach Boys.  Two years after the station went oldies, the call letters changed yet again on May 24, 2010 to the current WIFY. On September 2, 2014 WIFY dropped the Oldies format and became part of the radio network known as The Point, with an Adult Album Alternative format, simulcasting the Montpelier/Burlington network content of WNCS.

References

External links

IFY
Radio stations established in 1999
1999 establishments in Vermont
Adult album alternative radio stations in the United States